Tylan Grant (born 9 October 2001) is an English actor, known for playing Brooke Hathaway in the Channel 4 soap opera Hollyoaks. For his role as Brooke, Grant was nominated for Best Newcomer at the 2019 British Soap Awards, as well as Celebrity of the Year at the 2019 National Diversity Awards.

Early and personal life
Tylan Grant was born Talia Vanessa Grant on 9 October 2001 in London, to parents David and Carrie Grant. Grant also has three siblings; Olive, Arlo and Nathan. 

Grant was diagnosed with Asperger's syndrome in 2009, at the age of seven, and has spoken about the difficulties he faced while attending school, due to there being little awareness on the syndrome at the time. In a piece for i newspaper, Grant stated that teachers did not believe that he was autistic, and that nobody at school understood him. He also wrote: "I was scared of loud noises, terrified of certain subjects, I wasn’t sure how to make friends or how to keep friendships going, how to cope when I was teased about my afro hair, or how to eat next to someone who sneezed." Grant's mother Carrie revealed that when he was younger, Grant was "really badly bullied to the point where it made them mentally ill" and that he was "unable to escape the bullies". Father David added that Grant was hospitalised for mental health issues caused by the bullying, which transformed into cyber bullying while Grant was in hospital. 
Grant is a trans man and uses he/him pronouns.

Career
Grant made his professional acting debut in an episode of the CBBC sitcom So Awkward as Greta Masters. Then in 2018, he was cast in the Channel 4 soap opera Hollyoaks as Brooke Hathaway, making his first appearance as Brooke on 10 July 2018. Grant is the first BAME actor to play an autistic character on a television series. Grant appeared on Loose Women, where he explained that he is  different to Brooke, since they have different forms of autism.  He added how exciting it was to represent autism. In 2020, Grant's parents appeared in the soap as Mal and Zoe, the adoptive parents of Brooke's newborn child.

Filmography

Awards and nominations

References

External links
 

2001 births
21st-century English actors
Actors from London
English child actors
English television actors
English soap opera actors
English people of Zambian descent
LGBT Black British people
English LGBT actors
Living people
People with Asperger syndrome
Actors with autism
Transgender male actors